Vanadium oxytrichloride is the inorganic compound with the formula VOCl3.  This yellow distillable liquid hydrolyzes readily in air.  It is an oxidizing agent.  It is used as a reagent in organic synthesis.  Samples often appear red or orange owing to an impurity of vanadium tetrachloride.

Properties
VOCl3 is a vanadium compound with vanadium in the +5 oxidation state and as such is diamagnetic. It is tetrahedral with O-V-Cl bond angles of 111° and Cl-V-Cl bond angles of 108°. The V-O and V-Cl bond lengths are 157 and 214 pm, respectively.  VOCl3 is highly reactive toward water and evolves HCl upon standing. It is soluble in nonpolar solvents such as benzene, CH2Cl2,  and hexane. In some aspects, the chemical properties of VOCl3 and POCl3 are similar. One distinction is that VOCl3 is a strong oxidizing agent, whereas the phosphorus compound is not. Neat VOCl3 is the usual chemical shift standard for 51V NMR spectroscopy.

Preparation
VOCl3 arises by the chlorination of V2O5.  The reaction proceeds near 600 °C:
3 Cl2 + V2O5  →  2 VOCl3 + 1.5 O2

Heating an intimate (well-blended with tiny particles) mixture of V2O5, chlorine, and carbon at 200–400 °C also gives VOCl3. In this case the carbon serves as a deoxygenation agent akin to its use in the chloride process for the manufacturing of TiCl4 from TiO2.

Vanadium(III) oxide can also be used as a precursor:
3 Cl2 + V2O3  →  2 VOCl3 + 0.5 O2

A more typical laboratory synthesis involves the chlorination of V2O5 using SOCl2.
V2O5 + 3 SOCl2  →  2 VOCl3 + 3 SO2

Reactions

Hydrolysis and alcoholysis
VOCl3 quickly hydrolyzes resulting in vanadium pentoxide and hydrochloric acid.  In the picture, orange V2O5 can be seen forming on the walls of the beaker.  An intermediate in this process is VO2Cl:
2 VOCl3 + 3 H2O  →  V2O5 + 6 HCl
VOCl3 reacts with alcohols especially in the presence of a proton-acceptor to give alkoxides, as illustrated by this synthesis of vanadyl isopropoxide:
VOCl3 +  3 HOCH(CH3)2   →    VO(OCH(CH3)2)3  +  3 HCl

Interconversions to other V-O-Cl compounds
VOCl3 is also used in the synthesis of vanadium oxydichloride.
V2O5 + 3 VCl3 + VOCl3  →  6 VOCl2

VO2Cl can be prepared by an unusual reaction involving Cl2O. 
VOCl3 + Cl2O  →  VO2Cl  +  2 Cl2

At >180 °C,  VO2Cl decomposes to  V2O5 and  VOCl3.
Similarly, VOCl2 also decomposes to give VOCl3, together with VOCl.

Adduct formation
VOCl3 is strongly Lewis acidic, as demonstrated by its tendency to form adducts with various bases such as acetonitrile and amines.  In forming the adducts, vanadium changes from four-coordinate tetrahedral geometry to six-coordinate octahedral geometry:
VOCl3 + 2 H2NEt  →  VOCl3(H2NEt)2

Organic chemistry
VOCl3 is a catalyst or precatalyst in production of ethylene-propylene rubbers (EPDM).  In organic synthesis, it has been used for oxidative coupling of phenols and anisoles.

References

Vanadium(V) compounds
Oxychlorides
Metal halides
Vanadyl compounds